Frank Wade may refer to:

 Frank Wade (cricketer) (1871–1940), Australian cricketer
 Frank E. Wade (1873–1930), American football player and coach
 Frank Eugene Wade (1854–1929), president of the National Probation Association and New York Superintendent of State Prisons

See also
 Francis Wade (1909–1987), American Jesuit and professor of philosophy